María Gabriela Franco (born 15 March 1981) is a Venezuelan sport shooter. She tied for 37th place in the women's 25 metre pistol event and tied for 39th place in the women's 10 metre air pistol event at the 2000 Summer Olympics.

References

1981 births
Living people
Venezuelan female sport shooters
Olympic shooters of Venezuela
Shooters at the 2000 Summer Olympics
Pan American Games medalists in shooting
Pan American Games silver medalists for Venezuela
Shooters at the 1999 Pan American Games
Medalists at the 1999 Pan American Games
20th-century Venezuelan women
21st-century Venezuelan women